Harry Gordon Cheek (April 23, 1879 – August 25, 1927) was a Major League Baseball player. In 2 games, Cheek had 2 hits in 4 at-bats, with a .500 batting average.

Cheek was born in Kansas City, Missouri and died in Redwood City, California.

External links
Baseball Reference.com page

1879 births
1927 deaths
Baseball players from Missouri
Philadelphia Phillies players
Nevada Lunatics players
Fort Scott Giants players
Grand Forks Forkers players
Rock Island Islanders players
Sedalia Goldbugs players
Webb City Goldbugs players
Webb City Webfeet players
Albany Senators players
Baltimore Orioles (IL) players
Sacramento Sacts players
Vancouver Beavers players
Hastings Cubs players